Reuben Lindsay Gordon Jr. (January 21, 1855 – December 25, 1939) was an American attorney and politician who served in the Virginia House of Delegates from 1914 to 1930, representing Louisa County.

References

External links 

1855 births
1939 deaths
Democratic Party members of the Virginia House of Delegates
20th-century American politicians
People from Louisa, Virginia